Jean-Jacques Birgé (born 5 November 1952) is an independent French musician and filmmaker, at once music composer (co-founder of Un Drame Musical Instantané with which he records about 30 albums, as well as for movies, theater, dance, radio), film director (La nuit du phoque, Sarajevo a Street Under Siege, The Sniper), multimedia author (Carton, Machiavel, Alphabet), sound designer (exhibitions, CD-Roms, websites, Nabaztag, etc.), founder of record label GRRR. Specialist of the relations between sound and pictures, he has been one of the early synthesizer players and home studio creators in France in 1973, and with Un d.m.i. the initiator of the return of silent movies with live orchestra in 1976. His records show the use of samplers since 1980 and computers since 1985.

Since 1995, this polymath has become a sound designer in all multimedia areas and interactive composition.

Hardly classifiable musically, he may be likened to the encyclopedist current, such as Charles Ives, İlhan Mimaroğlu, Frank Zappa, René Lussier, Francois Sarhan, Jonathan Pontier, Jim O'Rourke or John Zorn who are mostly self-taught composers. His compositions follow cinematographic syntax more than the laws of harmony and counterpoint!

He has been writing a daily blog since 2005, actually on Mediapart, with more than 5000 articles.

Biography
After his studies at Idhec (Institut des hautes études cinématographiques, now La Fémis), Jean-Jacques Birgé is filled with a passion for images and sounds, and particularly for their potential to produce sense and create emotions. Birgé considers sound as a counterpoint to pictures and dialogue, an off-stage landscape and a wide opened window to imagination.

In 1975 he founded the record label GRRR (Defense de features on the famous Nurse with Wound list) and in 1976 the group Un Drame Musical Instantané (with Bernard Vitet and Francis Gorgé. He composed for movies (I. Barrère, D. Belloir, D. Cabrera, P. Desgraupes, P. O. Lévy, P. Morize, F. Reichenbach, F. Romand, Jacques Rouxel, R. Sangla, M. Trillat, la Cinémathèque Albert Kahn...), dance (J. Gaudin, Karine Saporta...), photography (Arles), theater, radio, and records about 30 albums. On stage, he plays live to silent movies (26 since 1976) as well as improvising or producing multimedia shows. For "Le K" with Richard Bohringer he was nominated at the 9èmes Victoires de la Musique.

As a moviemaker, 20 years after La nuit du phoque (issued on DVD with the reissue of the cult-record défense de), he directed Vis à vis : Idir et Johnny Clegg a capella. He received a BAFTA and the Jury Award in Locarno 1994 collectively for Sarajevo: a street under siege, and his short Le sniper was shown in more than 1000 theatres.

A specialist for realtime synthesis music instruments, he has always lived among new technologies which offer the possibility of conceiving strange and iconoclast objects. Simultaneously to his work as a sound designer for exhibitions-shows (Il était une fois la fête foraine, The Extraordinary Museum, The Laying of the Hands, Passerelle, Le Siècle Métro, Jours de Cirque, L'argent, Révélations, Monuments aux morts, Carambolages, French Pavilion Aïchi World Fair...), websites (BDDP-TBWA, Laurent-Perrier, Ville de Lyon, Compagnie Générale des Eaux, Rencontres Numer, Determinism, Else, Virtools, Adidas, Ptits reperes, Museum National d'Histoire Naturelle, Musée de l'Immigration...), and CD-Roms (At the Circus with Seurat, Fenêtre sur l'Art, Europrix 98, AZ, Firmenich, Le DVD-Rom du Louvre, Le Grand Jeu, Sethi et la couronne d'Egypte, Mr. Men series, 9 Cahiers Passeport, 4 Salto & Zelia, Domicile d'Ange Heureux...), he asserted himself as a multimedia author with Carton (Enhanced-CD where an original game refers to each song), Machiavel (interactive video scratch of 111 loops, with Antoine Schmitt), and Alphabet, created with Frédéric Durieu and Murielle Lefèvre from Kveta Pacovska's book for children (Grand Prix Möbius International 2000, Prix Multimédia de la SACD 2000, Coup de coeur Trophées SVM Mac, Prix de la meilleure adaptation au Festival de Bologne en Italie, La Mention Spéciale au Salon du Livre de Jeunesse à Montreuil, First Prize CineKid en Hollande, GigaMaus en Allemagne, First Prize Package MMCA au Japon, et aux USA : Oppenheim Toy Portfolio Platinum Award 2002, Parents’ Choice Silver Honor 2001, Discovery.com Award of Excellence 2001, Software Magic Award Parenting Magazine 2001, Children’s Software Review All Star Award 2001, Choosing Children’s Software Best Pick 2001, Best Software Pick Edutaining Kids.com 2001).

With this CD-Rom he inaugurated a new direction of work based generative action and interactivity which lets the player discover a new interpretation each time (on-line et off-line). He collaborates on the creation of sites lecielestbleu (with F.Durieu) and flyingpuppet.com (with Nicolas Clauss).
For lecielestbleu.com he received the Prix SCAM 2002 of the Best Internet Site meilleur site and the NarrowCast Content Award 2002 ... For Ulchiro on flyingpuppet.com he received the Prix du Centre Pompidou FlashFestival 2002 ...
Somnambules, together with Nicolas Clauss and Didier Silhol, won the Special Prize of Jury Senef 2003 (Seoul Net Festival), Prix de la Création Nouveaux Médias 2004 (Vidéoformes), 1st Prix France Telecom R&D Oone (Art Rock Festival), Prix SACD de la Création Interactive 2004, Prix ARS Electronica Net Vision / Net Excellence Honorary Mention 2004 (Austria) and is nominated among the 5 strangest sites at Yahoo! Best of 10 Years.
Boum! (Les inéditeurs) gets Fiction Award – Special Mention at BolognaRagazzi Digital Award 2016.

Besides his daily blog, Birgé writes in many magazines and teaches the relation between sound and pictures.
He designed the sound of Nabaztag, the smart rabbit.
His last artworks are Les Portes (Doors, interactive video installation with Nicolas Clauss) and Nabaz'mob (opera for 100 smart rabbits with Antoine Schmitt for which they receive Ars Electronica Award of Distinction Digital Musics 2009).
After CD Etablissement d'un ciel d'alternance, a duo with writer Michel Houellebecq, he produces dozens of online albums.
He currently plays with Amandine Casadamont (turntables), Vincent Segal (cello), Antonin-Tri Hoang (alto sax, bass clarinet), Sacha Gattino (misc.)... One of his last show uses the famous Oblique Strategies game of cards with musicians such as Médéric Collignon, Julien Desprez, Pascal Contet and many others.
His last participations to exhibitions feratured Musée du Louvre (2015), Grand Palais, Panthéon and Palais de Tokyo (2016), Cité des Sciences et de l'Industrie (2016-2018)...

In 2018, he plays at the closing of La Maison Rouge with Vincent Segal, Antonin-Tri Hoang and Mexican artist Daniela Franco. And he produces the CD The 100th Anniversary of Jean-Jacques Birgé (1952-2052). In 2020, the CD Perspectives for the 22nd Century follows this utopian path. and the double CD Pique-nique au labo features 28 guests among the best improvisers, showing that improvisation is not a style, but a way of living. In 2021, he recorded Fictions LP with saxophonist Lionel Martin, and in 2022 he reformed Un Drame Musical Instantané with Francis Gorgé and writer Dominique Meens. 

Site drame.org offers 173 hours of unissued free downlable music, plus a random radio.

Works

Records
 Intervention au milieu d'une prière en miettes, (SP Psych.KG, 2022), 1972
 Avant toute, Birgé-Gorgé (Le souffle continu), 1974–75
 Défense de, Birgé-Gorgé-Shiroc (GRRR), 1975 - CD reissue Mio, 2004 - LP reissue Wah-Wah, 2013
 Très toxique, Un d.m.i. (GRRR / also on Toxic Rice, Psych.KG, D) 1976 (issued 2023)
 Trop d'adrénaline nuit, Un d.m.i. (GRRR), 1977 - CD reissue GRRR, 2001
 Rideau !, Un d.m.i. (GRRR), 1980 - CD reissue Klanggalerie, 2017
 À travail égal salaire égal, Un d.m.i. (GRRR), 1981-82 - CD reissue Klang Galerie, 2018
 Musical direction of Éditions Ducaté, cassettes recorded with Jane Birkin, Annie Girardot, Annie Ernaux, Ludmila Mikaël... 1981–82
 Les bons contes font les bons amis, Un d.m.i. (GRRR), 1983 - CD reissue Klanggalerie, 2022
 L'homme à la caméra, Un d.m.i. (GRRR), 1984 - CD reissue Klanggalerie, 2020
 Carnage, Un d.m.i. (GRRR), 1985 - CD reissue Klanggalerie, 2021
 L'hallali, Un d.m.i. (GRRR), 1987
 Sous les mers, Un d.m.i. (GRRR), 1988
 Qui vive ?, Un d.m.i. (GRRR), 1989
 Le K, Un d.m.i. with Richard Bohringer on Dino Buzzati (GRRR + réédition Auvidis), Nomination at the 9th Victoires de la Musique, 1990–93
 Jeune fille qui tombe... tombe, Un d.m.i. (In Situ), 1991
 Kind Lieder, Un d.m.i. (GRRR), 1991
 Urgent Meeting, Un d.m.i. (GRRR/No Man's land), 1992 with Louis Sclavis, Vinko Globokar, Michael Riessler, Michel Godard...
 Opération Blow Up, Un d.m.i. (GRRR), 1992 with Brigitte Fontaine, Henri Texier, Valentin Clastrier, Carlos Zingaro, Joëlle Léandre, René Lussier, Luc Ferrari...
 Crasse-Tignasse, Un d.m.i. (Auvidis), 1993
 Sarajevo Suite, production + compositions by Un d.m.i. played by Dee Dee Bridgewater and Bălănescu String Quartet (L’empreinte digitale),1994
 Il était une fois la Fête Foraine, Un d.m.i. (Auvidis), 1995
 Haut-Karabagh : Musiques du Front, production (Auvidis),1995
 Direction record collection “Musiques d’ambiance” at Auvidis : Policier, Western, Science-Fiction, 3 CD with Francis Gorgé, 1995
 Le Sens du combat, Michel Houellebecq (Radio France), 1996
 Carton, Birgé-Vitet (GRRR), 1997
 Au fil du temps, Birgé-Vitet (CD in catalogue of the exhibition), 1997
 Machiavel, Un d.m.i. (GRRR), 1998 with Steve Argüelles, Benoît Delbecq, DJ Nem, Philippe Deschepper...
 Un petit tour, Aki Onda (All Access, Japon), 1999
 Trop d’adranaline nuit, Un d.m.i. (reissue + bonus, GRRR), 2001
 Défense de, Birgé Gorgé Shiroc (reissue CD + DVD 6 hours of unissued music & Film "La nuit du phoque", MIO), 2003
 Birgé alone : Inanga (in CMG#6 Ailleurs, 1999), Young Dynamite (in TraceLabel, 2005), Plomberie, Hantée and Roll Over Composer (in Nouveaux Dossiers de l'Audiovisuel n°3, INA, 2005)...
 Script, dialogues and hörspiel Radio Chronatoscaphe (in 25th anniv. of label nato 3 cd Le Chronatoscaphe), 2005
 Les Actualités, conception and realization of double-album + Un d.m.i. with Baco (Les Allumés du Jazz), 2006
 Établissement d'un ciel d'alternance, Houellebecq-Birgé (GRRR), 2007
 C'est le bouquet, Un d.m.i. (unissued CD to be downloaded with Sextant magazine, GRRR), 2007
 Participation to Thisness by Jef Lee Johnson (nato, 2005), Toukouleur Orchestra's album (2013), Carving Songs by Controlled Bleeding (2017), Aux Ronds-Points des Allumés du Jazz (2019)
 Many other recordings in England, Italy, Switzerland, Portugal, Austria, Germany, Japan, USA...
 91 unissued albums, 174 hours of music and 1197 pieces are online, free to listen and download on drame.org, 2010-2022
 Long Time No Sea, El Strøm (GRRR), 2017
 Jean-Jacques Birgé & Hélène Sage, Rendez-vous (Klanggalerie), 2018
 The 100th Anniversary, Jean-Jacques Birgé (GRRR), 2018
 Perspectives for the 22nd Century (MEG-AIMP), 2020
 Pique-nique au labo with 28 soloists (2CD, GRRR), 2020
 Plumes et poils, Un d.m.i. (GRRR), 2022
 Fictions with Lionel Martin (LP Ouch!), 2022
 FLUXUS +/- with Francis Gorgé, Mama Baer (Psych.KG (D)), 2022
 FLUXUS +/- with Kommissar Hjuler (Psych.KG (D)), 2022
 +/-dru_M?flux with Gerhard Laber, Kommissar Hjuler (Psych.KG (D)), 2022
 Toxic Rice, Un d.m.i. with Kommissar Hjuler (Psych.KG (D)), 2023

Films

Directing
 La Nuit du Phoque, Award at Belfort Festival, 1974 (DVD)
 Remember My Forgotten Man, video-paluche, 1976
 Idir-Johnny Clegg a capella (Vis à Vis, Point du Jour), 1993
 Collective realisation of Sarajevo: A Street Under Siege (Point du Jour-Saga), 1993, British Academy Award of Film & TV Arts (Bafta) and Locarno Film Festival Jury Award
 , text by Ademir Kenović, first fiction filmed in Sarajevo during the siege, shown in more than 1000 cinemas in France and abroad, 1994
 On Boat with Françoise Romand, 2008
 Short movies for digital novel "USA 1968 deux enfants", 2014
 Perspectives For The 22nd Century, co-directed with Nicolas Clauss, Sonia Cruchon, Valéry Faidherbe, Jacques Perconte, John Sanborn, Eric Vernhes, 2020

Music for films
 films directed by Patrick Barbéris, Luc Barnier, Igor Barrère et Etienne Lalou, Dominique Belloir, Dominique Cabréra, Sonia Cruchon, Corine Dardé, Pierre Desgraupes, Tom Drahos, Serge Duval, Valéry Faidherbe, Stéphane Frattini, Christophe Gans, Richard Hamon, Philippe Kotlarsky, Michèle Larue, Noël Burch, Nicolas Le Du, Pierre-Oscar Lévy, Bernard Mallaterre, Mathilde Morières, Pierre Morize, Natacha Nisic, Jacques Perconte, François Reichenbach, Françoise Romand, Jacques Rouxel, John Sanborn, Raoul Sangla, Miroslav Sebestik, Richard Ugolini, Daniel Verdier, Michaëla Watteaux, Cité des Sciences de La Villette, Cinémathèque Albert Kahn, Platform... 1973–2020

Exhibitions
 Music for Andy Warhol Exhibition Opening (Paris Modern Art Museum), 1971
 Music for Michel Potage Exhibition Opening (Paris), 1978
 La rue, la musique et nous (Arcueil), 1979
 Sound design of the Parc della Rimembranza (Napoli, Italy), 1981
 Economia : La Saga des Millar, sound design and music ; réal. Michel Séméniako (Cité des Sciences et de l'Industrie), 1986–1987
 Femmes en vue, musique (Le Mois de la Photo, Palais de Tokyo), 1988
 Il était une fois la Fête Foraine, sound design. Music with Bernard Vitet ; Raymond Sarti (Grande halle de la Villette), 1995
 Puppets, sound design (Fine Arts Institute of San Francisco, USA), 1996
 Electra, music and sound design “Théâtre d’objets”; R. Sarti (Cité des Enfants, Cité des Sciences), 1996
 The Extraordinary Museum (Kumamoto, Japon) et Euro Fantasia (Nagoya Dome, Japon), sound design. Music with Bernard Vitet ; R. Sarti, 1997
 Au Fil du Temps, music with Bernard Vitet (Corbeil-Essonnes), 1998
 Museum National d’Histoire Naturelle, sound design (Hyptique). 1998
 Le Siècle Métro, sound design, and music with Denis Colin ; Michal Batory (Maison de la RATP, Paris), 2000
 Pass, symphony for 26 iMacs, with A. Denize, E.Mineur, F.Durieu (Pass, Mons, Belgium), 2000
 The Laying of the hands, sound design and interactive music, with Mark Madel (Amsterdam Hospital), 2001
 Festival de la Ville (urban forum Créteil), 2001
 Jours de cirque, music with Bernard Vitet, sound design ; R. Sarti (Grimaldi Forum, Monaco), 2002
 Juno Beach, music and sound design (Musée du Débarquement, Omaha Beach), 2003
 L'argent, music and sound design (Pass, Mons, Belgium), 2003
 Music for 5 sculptures of the Museum: St Phalle, Calder, Oldenburg, Martin, Scurti (D.A.E.P. Centre Pompidou), 2003
 Zoo, interactive installation with lecielestbleu. House of Tomorrow (Melbourne, Australia) / Museum of the Future (Ars Electronica, Austria) / Mérignac, 2003–2010
 Time, interactive installation with lecielestbleu. Interactive Design (Centre Pompidou) / Somewhere Totally Else + History of the Modern Design (London, Great Bretain), Game Time (Melbourne, Australia), 2003–2004
 Alphabet, interactive installation (My Name is Game, Gana Art Gallery, Seoul, Korea), 2004
 La Pâte à Son, interactive installation with lecielestbleu. Centre Pompidou (Atelier des Enfants) / Museum of the Future (Ars Electronica, Austria) / IFCA (Slovenia) / OFFF Festival (Barcelona, Spain) / Festival du Film d'Animation d'Annecy / and 4 exhibitions in Korea : Uijeongbu Digital Arts Festival, SeNef, Ten Years After 3 (Daejeon), Digital! (Samsung Tesco Gallery, Ten Years After 3, Seoul), Mérignac, 2004–2010
 Anémone, octophonic music in motion, Dassault Systèmes (Aïchi World Fair, Japan), 2005
 Le Sniper, video installation (Soft Target, Utrecht, Nederland), 2005
 Musée du Quai Branly, sound design (Multimedi'Art Interactif d'or Fiamp.2006), 2005
 Musée de la Vendée, sound design, 2006
 Somnambules, interactive installation with Nicolas Clauss. Museum of the Future, Ars Electronica (Austria) / Stuttgart Film (Germany) / La Villette Numérique, Forum des Images-Nemo, Rur@rt & Ars Numerica (France) / Microwave (Hong Kong) / Japan Media Arts (Tokyo) / Mad'O3, MAEM & Confluencias (Spain) / São Paulo (Brazil) / Biennale Internationale de Media Art (Dual Reality, Seoul, Korea), 2004–2006
 Overture of Danse avec les Robots, quadriphonic music (Futuroscope, Poitiers), 2006
 Les Portes , interactive video installation with Nicolas Clauss (Festival Nemo, Espace Paul Ricard), 2006
 Nabaz'mob, opera pour 100 smart rabbits, installation with Antoine Schmitt, Wired NextFest (New York), Luminato (Toronto), Des souris et des hommes (Carré des Jalles), Musiques en Jouets (Musée des Arts Décoratifs, Paris), Ososphère (L'Aubette 1928, Strasbourg), Access (Pau), Abbaye de L'Escaladieu (Tarbes), EuraTechnologies (Lille), Musée Départemental de l'Oise (Beauvais), Parizone@Dream (La Gaîté Lyrique, Paris), ENSAD (Paris), 2006–2013
 Peugeot RCZ (IAA, Frankfurt, Germany), 2009
 St Gobain glass folding screen (Quantum!, Paris, France), 2009
 Concert-visit of Vinyl with Vincent Segal (La Maison Rouge, Paris, France), 2010
 Revelations, a digital odyssey through paintings, artistic direction and music for 23 short films directed by Pierre Oscar Lévy (Petit Palais, Paris), 2010. Hangaram Museum, Seoul Art Center, Korea, 2013.  Grand Prix Stratégies 2010, Prix des Étudiants, Prix Produit Grand Public
 Swedenborg's Room with Birgitte Lyregaard and Linda Edsjö (MAMC Strasbourg), 2012
 Video Game, sound design with Sacha Gattino (Cité des Sciences et de l'Industrie), 2013-2014
 Monuments to the Dead, soundscape for 15 loudspeakers, exhibition under the guidance of Raymond Depardon (Rencontres d'Arles & Panthéon), 2014–2016.
 Une brève histoire de l'avenir, sound creation (Suricog, Le Louvre), 2015
 Darwin, l'original, sound design with Sacha Gattino (Cité des Sciences et de l'Industrie), 2015-2016
 Carambolages, musical visit (Grand Palais), 2016
 Rester vivant, poetic juke-box with Michel Houellebecq (Palais de Tokyo), 2016
 Special Effects, Steal The Scene!, sound design and music with Sacha Gattino (Cité des Sciences et de l'Industrie), 2017-2018
 Melting Rust with Anne-Sarah Le Meur, Utopian Cities Programmed Societies (Fabrica de Pensule, Cluj, Romania), 2019
 Omni-Vermille with Anne-Sarah Le Meur, ZKM Center for Art and Media Karlsruhe (Germany), 2020
 L'opéra cassé with Romina Shama (Musée Transitoire, Genève, Switzerland), 2021
 The Theatre of Apparitions with Roger Ballen (pavillion of South Africa, Venice Biennale, Italy), 2022

Live shows

With UN D.M.I.
 Long series of Poisons, 1976–79
 Ciné-concerts (with 24 silent movies), 1977–99
 Rideau!, 1980
 Pieces for a 15-piece orchestra, 1981–1986
 Le trou, from Edgar Allan Poe, 1982
 Music for fire organ and orchestra (instruments built by Vitet), 1983
 Live with Los Angeles Olympic Games (Festival d'Avignon), 1984
 La Bourse et la vie (Nouvel Orchestre Philharmonique de Radio France, dir.Yves Prin), 1984
 45 secondes départ arrêté & Fééries Jacobines (fireworks), 1984–85
 Music for ballet by Jean Gaudin (Ecarlate), Karine Saporta (Manèges, Le Coeur Métamorphosé), Lulla Card... 1985–1989
 Jeune fille qui tombe... tombe by Dino Buzzati (spoken oratorio, Michael Lonsdale / Daniel Laloux), 1985–90
 Le K de Dino Buzzati (spoken oratorio, M.Lonsdale / Richard Bohringer - D.Laloux; R.Sarti), 1985-92
 La Fosse (opéra-bouffe, Martine Viard, Louis Hagen-William, Ensemble de l'Itinéraire), 1987
 Le Chateau des Carpathes, from Jules Verne (burning cantata, Frank Royon Le Mée), 1987
 20 000 lieues sous mers (show of illusions and imaginary museum on 2 boats, La Péniche Opéra), 1988
 Zappeurs-Pompiers 1 & 2 (live zapping on a huge screen, L.Card, Éric Houzelot / Guy Pannequin), 1987–89
 J'accuse by Émile Zola (Richard Bohringer, D.Fonfrède, Ahmed Madani, 70 musicians, dir.Jean-Luc Fillon; Raymond Sarti), 1989
 Contrefaçons (for brass orchestra, dir. J-L. Fillon), 1989
 Kind Lieder (nine songs which hurt), 1991
 Let my children hear music from Charlie Mingus, 1992
 Crasse-Tignasse (nine songs for children), 1993–94
 Machiavel (techno dance with interactive images), 1999–2000
 Resurrection (sextet), 2014

Other Live Shows
 Concerts with Epimanondas, Birgé Gorgé Shiroc, Red Noise, Dagon, George Harrison, Lard Free, Cesare Massaranti and Oliver Johnson, Opération Rhino, la Compagnie Lubat... 1969–1979
 Opening of the Mois de la Francophonie with André Dussollier and Bernard-Pierre Donnadieu, 1992
 Sarajevo suite, scenery, with Claude Piéplu, P. Charial, B. Vitet, Henri Texier Quintet, Lindsay Cooper Sextet, Kate and Mike Westbrook, Chris Biscoe and Bălănescu String Quartet,1994
 Le sens du combat with Martine Viard and Michel Houellebecq, 1996
 Établissement d’un ciel d’alternance, duo with Michel Houellebecq, created for 10th Anniversary of Inrockuptibles at Fondation Cartier, 1996
 Dans la lumière et dans la force, hommage to poet André Velter, with Michael Lonsdale, Denise Gence, Elise Caron, Bernard-Pierre Donnadieu, 1996
 10th anniversary of Bar Floréal, Maison Européenne de la Photographie, 1996
 À l’écoute et Djoutche, hommage to Colette Magny, with Bernard Vitet, 1997
 Birgé Hôtel, improvisations on texts by and with Alain Monvoisin, Michel Houellebecq, 1998
 Touché !, Theremin solo, with projections by Murielle Lefèvre, 2000
 La kabine electroniq, with Léo and Etienne Brunet, 2001
 (se) diriger dans l’incertain, convention de l’APM avec Denis Colin et Didier Petit, Pyramide du Louvre, 2002
 Quartet with Yves Dormoy, Antoine Berjeaut and Pablo Cueco, 2002
 Solo with experimental silent movies, Ménagerie de Verre, 2003
 The Biggest Drum & Bass Jam Ever Made, Batofar, 2003
 Sarajevo Suite et Fin, with Nicolas Clauss and Pascale Labbé, 2003
 Musical director for the Evenings of Rencontres d’Arles de la Photographie (soundtracks + live shows with Elise Caron, Denis Colin, Philippe Deschepper, Eric Échampard, Didier Petit, Bernard Vitet, Ève Risser, Antonin-Tri Hoang, Linda Edsjö), 2002–2005, 2011-2015
 Somnambules, with N. Clauss, P. Labbé and D. Petit, 2006
 Création sonore de Une Médée, mise en scène d'Anne-Laure Liégeois (Le Festin, Montluçon), 2006
 Hommage à - Moondog - A Tribute by, solo, 2006
 Électrofication with music students (Jazz 93), and  Somnambules with Nicolas Clauss, Étienne Brunet and Éric Échampard (Le Triton, Les Lilas), 2007
 Nabaz'mob, opera for 100 smart rabbits, with Antoine Schmitt, Web Flash Festival (Centre Pompidou) / Wired NextFest (New York) / Scopitone (Nantes) / Nuit Blanche (Amiens) / Recalling RFID (Amsterdam), Le Cube, Nuit Blanche (Paris), Musiques Libres (Besançon), SIANA (Évry), Des souris et des hommes (St Médard-en-Jalles), Robotix's (PASS, Mons, Belgique), Entre chien et loup (Quimper), Nuit Blanche (Metz), Nissan Cube Store (London & Paris), Rokolectiv (Bucarest, Romania), ICT (Belgium), Meta.morf (Norway), Lab30 (Germany), Gateways/Kumu (Estonia), Orléanoïde (Orléans), 2006-2014 Ars Electronica Award of Distinction Digital Musics
 , 2008
 Duo with Nicolas Clauss, 2008
 Mascarade with Antoine Schmitt, 2010
 Duo with Vincent Segal, 2010–2011
 Duo with Antonin-Tri Hoang (guest: Lucien Alfonso), 2011-2012
 El Strøm, with Birgitte Lyregaard and Sacha Gattino, 2011–2012
 La chambre de Swedenborg with Birgitte Lyregaard and Linda Edsjö, 2012
 Le grand réinventaire with Ève Risser and Antonin-Tri Hoang, 2012
 Revue de presse with Jacques Rebotier, 2012
 Dodécadanse with Claudia Triozzi, Sandrine Maisonneuve, Vincent Segal, 2012
 Power Symphony, music for Prix Pictet, 2012
 Trio with Vincent Segal, Antonin-Tri Hoang, Edward Perraud, 2012-2013
 Dépaysages, trio with Jacques Perconte, 2012-2013
 Audiovisual performance with Nicolas Clauss and Sylvain Kassap, 2013
 Freed at La Java with Jorge Velez, Bass Clef, 2013-2014
 Dreams and Nightmares with Alexandra Grimal, Antonin-Tri Hoang, Fanny Lasfargues, Edward Perraud, 2014
 Un coup de dés jamais n'abolira le hasard with Birgitte Lyregaard, Linda Edsjö, Médéric Collignon, Julien Desprez, Antonin-Tri Hoang, Pascal Contet, 2014-2015
 Tribute to Jacques Thollot with Fantazio, Antonin-Tri Hoang, 2015
 Tribute to Jean Morières, 2015
 Entrechats with Bumcello, 2016
 Avant toute with Francis Gorgé, 2016
 Harpon with Amandine Casadamont, 2016
 Défauts de prononciation with Sophie Bernado, Linda Edsjö, 2017
 L'isthme des ismes with Antonin-Tri Hoang, Samuel Ber, 2017
 , 2018
 OSO with Laurent Stoutzer, David Coignard, 2019
 , 2019-2020
 , 2019

CD-ROMs to iPad apps
 At the Circus with Seurat , music and sound design (Réunion des Musées Nationaux - Gallimard - Hyptique), 1996
 Carton, CD-Extra by Birgé-Vitet with photographer Michel Séméniako and Hyptique (GRRR), 1997
 Fenêtre sur l'Art, sound design (Réunion des Musées Nationaux-Vilo-Hyptique), 1998
 Machiavel, CD Audio/Rom of Un d.m.i. featuring an interactive work by Jean-Jacques Birgé and Antoine Schmitt, vision critique et sensible de la planète, zapping of 111 video loops (GRRR),1998
 AZ, music and sound design (Lux Modernis, Dauphin d'Or 99), 1998
 Firmenich, music with Denis Colin and sound design (Lux Modernis, Dauphin d'Or 99), 1998
 EuroPrix 98, music and sound design for European Multimedia trophees : CD-Rom, gala evening and TV show with Étienne Mineur (No Frontiere), 1998
 Mon Atelier De Noël, music and sound design (Hachette-Hyptique), 1998
 Cahiers Passeport, series of 7 CD-Roms, sound design (Hachette-Hyptique), 1998–2003
 La Tendresse, Cacharel, sound design (Lux Modernis), 1999
 Alphabet, interactive script, sound design and music (Dada Media-NHK Educational), 1999 Grand Prix Möbius International 2000, Prix Multimédia de la SACD 2000, Coup de coeur Trophées SVM Mac, Prix de la meilleure adaptation au Festival de Bologne en Italie, La Mention Spéciale au Salon du Livre de Jeunesse à Montreuil, First Prize CineKid en Hollande, GigaMaus en Allemagne, First Prize Package MMCA au Japon, et aux USA : Oppenheim Toy Portfolio Platinum Award 2002, Parents’ Choice Silver Honor 2001, Discovery.com Award of Excellence 2001, Software Magic Award Parenting Magazine 2001, Children’s Software Review All Star Award 2001, Choosing Children’s Software Best Pick 2001, Best Software Pick Edutaining Kids.com 2001 Le Louvre, sound interface DVD-Rom (Montparnasse Multimédia, Flèche d'or, EMMA Award), 1999
 Le Grand Jeu, music and sound design (Hyptique-APCR-Buschet-Chastel), 2000
 Sethi et la couronne d'Egypte, music and sound design (Montparnasse Multimédia), 2000
 M. Heureux et le monde à l'envers, music and sound design (Hyptique-Emme), 2001
 Mr Men, 8 CD-Roms, music and sound design (Hyptique-Emme), 2002
 Salto et Zélia, 4 CD-Roms Atout P'tit Clic, sound design (Hyptique-Hachette), 2002–2004
 Le Bal, interactive music with B.Vitet, Prix SACD Création Interactive, 2002
 1+1, une histoire naturelle du sexe, music for film and DVD-rom, (INA-Hyptique) Prix Möbius Sciences 2002, Prix Spécial du Jury Möbius International, Grand Prix Europrix Education/e-learning 2003, 2002
 Allonnes, music and sound design (incandescence/CNRS), 2003
 Domicile d'Ange heureux, music and sound design (dadamedia), Bologna Award, 2003
 Musée Fenaille, Rodez (Hyptique), 2004
 Troubles des apprentissages (ARTA), 2004
 Salto et Zélia (Hyptique-Hachette), sound design of DVDi Le chateau abandonné, 2005
 Balloon for iPad (Ed. Volumiques), sound design with Sacha Gattino, 2012
 Leonardo da Vinci's Dream Machine for iPad with Nicolas Clauss (Cité des Sciences et de l'Industrie), 2012
 DigDeep, music and sound design for iPad (Les indéditeurs), 2014
 Le ballon, Le safari en ballon, La fusée, La soucoupe volante, music and sound design (Ed. Volumiques, coll. Zephyr), 2015
 Boum!, music and sound design for iPad and Androïd (Les indéditeurs), Bologna Ragazzi Digital Award Special Mention 2016, Special Jury Prize Ehon Awards 2017), 2015
 La Maison Fantome, music and sound design with Sacha Gattino for iPad and Androïd (Ed. Volumiques, coll. Zephyr), 2015
 World of Yo-Ho, music and sound design (Ed. Volumiques), 2016
 Carambolages, music & sound score (exhibition at Grand Palais, Paris), 2016
 Woodchuck's Sleep, music and sound, for iPad (Numix), 2020-2022

Internet sites
 lecielestbleu : Prix SCAM 2001–2002, Meilleur Site Internet, Prix Coup de Coeur Narrowcast Content Awards 2002 FlyingPuppet.com : Prix Spécial Centre Pompidou FlashFestival 2002 Spectacle - Danse interactive Somnambules : Senef Special Prize of Jury 2003 (Seoul Net Festival), Prix de la Création Nouveaux Médias Vidéoformes 2004 (Clermont-Ferrand), Prix de la Création Interactive SACD 2004, 1st Prize France Telecom R&D Oone (Art Rock Festival, St Brieuc), Prix Ars Electronica Net Vision / Net Excellence Honorary Mention 2004 (Autriche) and a nomination for the Best of 10 Years of Yahoo! as "The strangest site". Also: Rencontres Numer, BDDP-TBWA, Laurent-Perrier, Ville de Lyon, GRRR, Compagnie Générale des Eaux, ZoéTV, Determinism, Du côté des filles, Else Productions, Magado (Gallimard, avec Moebius), Virtools, Adidas, Nike, Fête de l'Internet 2001 (Matignon), lesmetiers.net (Caparif), Museum National d'Histoire Naturelle, Musée de l'Immigration, Ptits repères (Marque Repère), 2025 ex machina (serious game)...
 Web-series Prévert Exquis with Isabelle Fougère, Sonia Cruchon, Mikaël Cixous (Prix du meilleur projet francophone Cross Video Days TV5Monde), 2017.

Sound Design for objects and landscapes
Nabaztag, smart rabbit, as well as Mir:ror and dal:dal (Violet), 2005–2009 / 2020
 Telesound (Readiymate), 2010-2013
 Study on the Métro du Grand Paris, 2014-2015
 Facade of La Maison de la Réunion, Paris, 2015
 Audio nudge messages of SNCF RER, 2020

Various
 Foundation of light-shows H Lights & L'Œuf Hyaloïde : Cirque Bonjour, Daevid Allen Gong, Red Noise, Crouille-Marteaux (Pierre Clémenti, Jean-Pierre Kalfon, Melmoth), Dagon, Epimanondas, Steamhammer, Kevin Ayers... 1969–1974
 Light-Book, graphic works, Imprimerie Union, 1973
 Music for audiovisuals and records by Robert and Thierry Dehesdin, Michel Séméniako, Marie-Jésus Diaz, Charles Bitsch, Noël Burch, Claude Thiébaut, Daniel Verdier... 1975–1990
 Production of radio shows:U.S.A. le complot and La peur du vide, France Musique, 1983Improvisation mode d’emploi (series), France Culture, 1988Écarlate, France Culture, 1989
 La corde à linge, novel with sounds and pictures, publie.net, 2011
 USA 1968 deux enfants, novel for iPad with sounds, pictures, films, interactivity, etc., Les inéditeurs, 2014
 Press articles written for Allumés du Jazz, Muziq, Jazz Magazine, Jazz@round, Jazzosphere, Nouveaux Dossiers de l'Audiovisuel, Revue du Cube, L'autre quotidien, La Nuit, Le Monde Diplomatique, Les Cahiers de l'Herne, Mediapart, 1998–2022

Notes

Sources
 Long interview with Klemen Breznikar, It's Psychedelic Baby! Magazine, (March 2022)
 Couleurs du monde with Françoise Degeorges, France Musique (March 2021)
 4 hours radio interview with Nico Bogaerts on Radio Panik (1 2 December 2020)
 Long interview with Franpi Barriaux in Citizen Jazz (September 2018)
 Tapage nocturne on France Musique with Bruno Letort (11/03/2017)
 Le Parisien (11/29/2014)
  Interview and article in site Turbulence
 34 pages on Jean-Jacques Birgé in Sextant #3 (June 2007)
 8 pages interview on Impro Jazz #155 (May 2009)
 4 pages by Annick Hémery in SVM Mac (November 2003 : 1 2 3 4)
 Annik Rivoire on Paris Connection'' in Liberation (02/23/2003)
 Stéphane Ollivier on Un d.m.i. dans Vacarme (summer 1997)
 On Drame :
 A blindfold test by Stéphane Ollivier in Jazz Magazine (January 1999 : 1 2)
 Le Drame, 4 pages by Francis Marmande dans Jazz Magazine (January 1990: 1 2 3 4)
 Self-portrait with Alain-René Hardy in Jazz Magazine (January 1978 : 1 2)

External links
 French Daily Blog by Jean-Jacques Birgé (2005-2022)
 Jean-Jacques Birgé's own site
 Un Drame Musical Instantané and GRRR Records' site
 Machiavel, interactive work (free download), with Antoine Schmitt
 Nabaz'mob, Opera for 100 smart rabbits, with Antoine Schmitt
 Disques GRRR distributed by Orkhêstra International, Les Allumés du Jazz (WebRadio) and on Bandcamp

1952 births
Musicians from Paris
Living people
20th-century classical composers
21st-century classical composers
French experimental musicians
French classical composers
French male classical composers
20th-century French composers
21st-century French composers
Electroacoustic music composers
French film score composers
French male film score composers
Male television composers
Postmodern composers
French electronic musicians
20th-century French male musicians
21st-century French male musicians
Avant-garde jazz musicians
French multi-instrumentalists
French keyboardists
French contemporary artists
French multimedia artists
French film directors
French record producers